MV Serengeti is a Lake Victoria passenger and cargo ship operated by the Marine Services Company Limited of Mwanza, Tanzania.

Serengeti has a ramp in her bow for road vehicle access. In design she is a vehicular and passenger ferry, but MSC operates her in tramp trade.

She was built in 1988 for the Tanzania Railways Corporation Marine Division. In 1997 the Marine Division became a separate company, Marine Services Company Ltd.

See also
Transport in Tanzania

References

1988 ships
Ships built in Tanzania
Passenger ships of Tanzania
Cargo ships